Jaiden Waggoner (born February 3, 1997) is an American soccer player.

Career

College & Amateur 
Waggoner began playing college soccer at Brigham Young University, where he played soccer with the college team in the USL PDL. In his sophomore year he transferred to Utah Valley University, where he played for a further three seasons.

Waggoner also spent time in the PDL with Albuquerque Sol, but never made an appearance for the team.

Professional 
On July 8, 2020, Waggoner signed with USL Championship side Las Vegas Lights. He made his professional debut on August 15, 2020, starting in a 1–0 loss to Orange County SC.

References

External links 
 
 Utah Valley profile

1997 births
Living people
American soccer players
Association football defenders
BYU Cougars men's soccer players
Utah Valley Wolverines men's soccer players
Albuquerque Sol FC players
Las Vegas Lights FC players
Soccer players from Utah
People from Spanish Fork, Utah
USL Championship players
USL League Two players